Bray Park is a suburb in the Moreton Bay Region, Queensland, Australia.

Geography 
Bray Park is bounded by Four Mile Creek in the south, the North Coast railway line in the east, Francis Road in the north, and Old North Road in the west.

There is no railway station within Bray Park. However, Bray Park railway station is just south of the suburb in neighbouring Strathpine, providing passengers services on the  Redcliffe Peninsula Line of the Queensland Rail City network.

History 
The suburb was named on 1 April 1970 after John Sanders Bray, a former Pine Rivers Shire councillor from May 1946 to March 1973. He was shire chairman from 1950 to 1973 (the longest serving chairman of the shire). His father Thomas Nathaniel Bray moved to the district in 1900 and established a dairy farm on Gympie Road that John Bray later took over.

Bray Park State School opened on 30 January 1973. In 1981 a special education unit was opened but it closed in 1988

Holy Spirit Catholic Primary School opened on 6 March 1977.

Bray Park State High School opened on 27 January 1987.

Genesis Christian College opened on 1 February 1991.

The median age of the Bray Park population was 33 years, 4 years below the national median of 37. 78.4% of people living in Bray Park were born in Australia. The other top responses for country of birth were New Zealand 5.7%, England 3.4%, Philippines 0.9%, South Africa 0.8%, and Fiji 0.6%. 90% of people spoke only English at home; the next most common languages were 0.7% Hindi, 0.7% Samoan, 0.4% Tagalog, 0.4% Cantonese, and 0.3% Afrikaans.

Education 
Bray Park State School is a government primary (Prep-6) school for boys and girls at Hopetoun Street. In 2017, the school had an enrolment of 418 students with 32 teachers (28 full-time equivalent) and 31 non-teaching staff (19 full-time equivalent). In 2018, the school had an enrolment of 423 students with 31 teachers (29 full-time equivalent) and 33 non-teaching staff (20 full-time equivalent). The school includes a special education program.

Holy Spirit School is a Catholic primary (Prep-6) school for boys and girls at 102 Sparkes Road. In 2017, the school had an enrolment of 615 students with 47 teachers (39 full-time equivalent) and 25 non-teaching staff (16 full-time equivalent). In 2018, the school had an enrolment of 598 students with 47 teachers (40 full-time equivalent) and 27 non-teaching staff (18 full-time equivalent).

Genesis Christian College is a private primary and secondary (Prep-12) school for boys and girls at 10 Youngs Crossing Road.  In 2017, the school had an enrolment of 1,495 students with 109 teachers (99 full-time equivalent) and 96 non-teaching staff (75 full-time equivalent). In 2018, the school had an enrolment of 1519 students with 108 teachers (99 full-time equivalent) and 102 non-teaching staff (77 full-time equivalent).

Bray Park State High School is a government secondary (7-12) school for boys and girls at Lavarack Road. In 2017, the school had an enrolment of 792 students with 74 teachers (69 full-time equivalent) and 45 non-teaching staff (31 full-time equivalent). In 2018, the school had an enrolment of 860 students with 76 teachers (72 full-time equivalent) and 45 non-teaching staff (30 full-time equivalent). The school includes a special education program.

Bray Park State High School is a government secondary (7-12) school for boys and girls at Lavarack Road.

Amenities 
The Moreton Bay Regional Council operates a mobile library service which visits Kensington Village on Sovereign Way.

Bray Park Samoan Church meets at the Norris State School Hall in Norris Road in Bracken Ridge. It is part of the Wesleyan Methodist Church.

There are a number of parks in the suburb, including:

 Allena Park
 Durakai Reserve
 John Bray Park
 John Davidson Park
 Kumbari Reserve
 Les Hughes Sporting Complex
 Neilson Park
 Oakley Park
 Odempa Park
 Wendy Allison Park

References

External links
 University of Queensland: Queensland Places: Bray Park

Suburbs of Moreton Bay Region